Paul Dolan may refer to:

Paul Dolan (behavioural scientist) (born 1968), professor and chair at the London School of Economics
Paul Dolan (athlete) (1927–?), Irish Olympic sprinter
Paul Dolan (baseball) (born 1958), chairman/CEO of the Cleveland Indians of Major League Baseball
Paul Dolan (soccer) (born 1966), former member of men's national soccer team in Canada